Toledo, Ohio, held an election for mayor on November 7, 2017. The election was officially nonpartisan, with the top two candidates from the September 12 primary election advancing to the general election, regardless of party. Incumbent Democratic Mayor Paula Hicks-Hudson lost reelection to Lucas County Treasurer Wade Kapszukiewicz.

Primary election

Candidates
 Opal Covey, perennial candidate
 Paula Hicks-Hudson, incumbent Mayor of Toledo
 Wade Kapszukiewicz, Treasurer of Lucas County
 Tom Waniewski, city councilor

Results

General election

Candidates
 Paula Hicks-Hudson, incumbent Mayor of Toledo
 Wade Kapszukiewicz, Treasurer of Lucas County

Results

References

Mayoral elections in Toledo, Ohio
Toledo
Toledo